Ángel Suquía Goicoechea (2 October 1916 – 13 July 2006) was a Spanish Catholic cardinal who served as archbishop of Madrid from 1983 until 1994.

He was educated at the La Salle Christian Brothers at Beasain from 1925 until 1927. He entered the Minor Seminary of Saturrarán, Motrico, Guipúzcoa, and remained there until 1931, whereupon he entered the Major Seminary of Vitoria, until 1936. When the Spanish Civil War started in 1936, he was destined to the fort of Guadalupe as a soldiers' instructor. In 1939, he travelled to the Benedictine monastery of Maria Laach in Germany, to study liturgy but when the Second World War started in that same year, he quickly returned to Spain. He entered the Pontifical Gregorian University in Rome in 1946 remaining there until 1949 where he obtained a doctorate in theology with the highest grades with his thesis on La santa Misa en la espiritualidad de San Ignacio de Loyola.

He was ordained to the priesthood on 7 July 1940. On 17 May 1966 Pope Paul VI appointed him to be the Bishop of Almería. He served as bishop of Málaga from 1969 to 1973.  He became Archbishop of Santiago de Compostela on 13 April 1973. On 12 April 1983 he was chosen to succeed Cardinal Vicente Enrique y Tarancón as Archbishop of Madrid by Pope John Paul II.

On 25 May 1985 he was created Cardinal-Priest of Gran Madre di Dio. He remained at the see of Madrid until 1994 when he reached the age of 77. He is buried in Almudena Cathedral.

Gallery

References

1916 births
2006 deaths
20th-century Spanish cardinals
Archbishops of Madrid
Cardinals created by Pope John Paul II
People from Goierri